Proverbs 30 is the 30th chapter of the Book of Proverbs in the Hebrew Bible or the Old Testament of the Christian Bible. The book is a compilation of several wisdom literature collections: the heading in Proverbs 1:1 may be intended to regard Solomon as the traditional author of the whole book, but the dates of the individual collections are difficult to determine, and the book probably obtained its final shape in the post-exilic period. This chapter first records "the sayings of Agur", followed by a collection of epigrams and aphorisms.

Text
The original text is written in the Hebrew language. This chapter is divided into 33 verses.

Textual witnesses
Some early manuscripts containing the text of this chapter in Hebrew are of the Masoretic Text, which includes the Aleppo Codex (10th century), and Codex Leningradensis (1008).

There is also a translation into Koine Greek known as the Septuagint, made in the last few centuries BC. Extant ancient manuscripts of the Septuagint version include Codex Vaticanus (B; B; 4th century), Codex Sinaiticus (S; BHK: S; 4th century), and Codex Alexandrinus (A; A; 5th century).

Structure
Michael Fox,an American biblical scholar, divides this chapter into sections:
 = The Words of Agur
 = Epigrams and Aphorisms
 = Aphorism a – Denouncing a Slave
 = Epigrams i – The Wicked Generation
a = Aphorism b – The Epitome of Greed
 = Epigrams ii – Four Greedy Things
 = Aphorism c – Contempt for Parents
 = Epigrams iii – Four Wondrous Ways-and One More
 = Epigrams iv – Four Things That Shake the Earth
 = Epigrams v – Four Creatures Small but Wise
 = Epigrams vi – Four Creatures with a Stately Gait
 = Epigrams vii – Churning Up Quarrels

Words of Agur (30:1–9)
This collection is ascribed to an unknown non-Israelite sage (cf. also ). Fox suggests that it could have been appended to Proverbs because of its valuable cautionary comments and the exaltation of the Torah. The closeness 'in word and spirit' to Psalm 73 is noted as Agur, like the psalmist, combines confession of ignorance with a profession of faith and exultation in the insight that comes from God alone, while urging people to turn directly to God as a safeguard against temptation.

Aberdeen theologian Kenneth Aitken notes that Agur's sayings may not extend beyond verse 14, as the first 14 verses are separate from verses 15 onwards in the Septuagint, but also comments that "opinion is divided on whether they end before verse 14" (possible at verses 4, 6, or 9). The editors of the New American Bible, Revised Edition, suggest that the "original literary unit" probably consisted of verses 1 to 6.

Verse 1
The words of Agur the son of Jakeh, the oracle.
The man declares to Ithiel,
to Ithiel and Ukal:
"The oracle" translates the Hebrew word massa, which could describe the sayings as a prophetic type 'revelation' (cf. Habakkuk 1:1), but here may designate 'the tribe or place of Massa in northern Arabia' to which Agur could belong (RSV).
"To Ithiel, to Ithiel and Ukal" (KJV: "unto Ithiel, even unto Ithiel and Ucal"; ESV: "I am weary, O God; I am weary, O God, and worn out") : these names can presumably be Agur's sons or disciples.

Verse 2
Surely I am more brutish than any man, and have not the understanding of a man.

Verse 4
Who has ascended up into heaven, or descended?
 Who has gathered the wind in his fists?
Who has bound the waters in a garment?
Who has established all the ends of the earth?
What is His name, and what is the name of His son,
if you know?
Like those in Job 38–41, these rhetorical questions emphasize "the inscrutability of God's ways".

Verses 5–6

The editors of the New American Bible, Revised Edition, suggest that the original Agur text probably ended with these verses, because the first six verses reflect a single contrast between human fragility (and ignorance) and divine power (and knowledge).

Epigrams and Aphorisms (30:10–33)
This part contains various epigrams and three short aphorisms in the midst. Most of the epigrams (similar to ) take the form of lists. Epigrams i and vii contain unnumbered lists whose items are grouped by theme and anaphora (each line starts with the same word). Epigram v is a single-number list with four items. Epigrams ii, iii, iv, and vi are graded numerical sayings, in the form "Three things… and four". The final item in the series is usually the climax and focal point.

Verse 14

"Knives": from Hebrew: ma'akhelet, "meat-cleavers", also used in the story of the Binding of Isaac, are 'not ordinary knives but the kind used to butcher meat'.

Verse 15

"The leech has two daughters": implying a greedy person, or likely 'a greedy woman', because the Hebrew word for "leech" is a feminine noun. The "two daughters" is seen as 'a reference to the two suckers of the leech'.
"Three things...four": Compare to : "For three transgressions of Damascus, and for four, I will not turn away the punishment thereof."
The whole verse 15 can be translated differently. The Hebrew word for leach is "Aluka", can also be a person name, which wrote at least the two verses 15-16 and verse 15 will be translated so: "Aluka is saying: Two daughters (says) give give The third never satisfied, The fourth never say it is enough" If so, verse 16 is explain for verse 15 (details about the daughters)

Verse 16

"The grave": or "Sheol" is 'never sated with the dead, always wanting more' (cf. ); is placed in a parallelism (in an ironic antithesis) with a blocked womb, which is 'never satisfied with its condition of barrenness, always hungry to produce life' (cf. ) also like the desire of the earth for water, and the fire for fuel (cf. ).

Verse 31

"A greyhound": or "strutting rooster" (NKJV); is literally 'one girt of loins' or 'girded of waist', i.e. 'the strutter', usually taken with the LXX as referring to the cock, though other animals such as the warhorse have been proposed.
"A king against whom there is no uprising": according to a Jewish tradition, or "a king whose troops are with him" in NKJV.

See also
 Ant
 Locust

Related Bible parts: Job 38, Job 39, Job 40, Job 41, Psalm 73, Amos 1

References

Sources

External links
 Jewish translations:
 Mishlei - Proverbs - Chapter 30 (Judaica Press) translation [with Rashi's commentary] at Chabad.org
 Christian translations:
 Online Bible at GospelHall.org (ESV, KJV, Darby, American Standard Version, Bible in Basic English)
 Book of Proverbs Chapter 30 King James Version
  Various versions

30